Joni Jaako (born 24 February 1986) is a Swedish sprinter who specializes in the 400 metres.

He finished fourth in 4 × 400 metres relay at the 2006 IAAF World Indoor Championships, with teammates Johan Wissman, Andreas Mokdasi and Mattias Claesson.

His personal best time is 47.04 seconds, achieved in July 2005 in Kaunas.

External links

1986 births
Living people
Swedish male sprinters
Place of birth missing (living people)
21st-century Swedish people